Regenerating islet-derived protein 3 gamma (also Regenerating islet-derived protein III-gamma) is a protein that in humans is encoded by the REG3G gene.

Intestinal paneth cells produce REG3G (or REG3 gamma) via stimulation of toll-like receptors (TLRs) by pathogen-associated molecular patterns (PAMPs). REG3 gamma specifically targets Gram-positive bacteria because it binds to their surface peptidoglycan layer. It is one of several antimicrobial peptides produced by paneth cells.

Notes and references

Bibliography